Powerlifting is a strength sport that consists of three attempts at maximal weight on three lifts: squat, bench press, and deadlift. As in the sport of Olympic weightlifting, it involves the athlete attempting a maximal weight single-lift effort of a barbell loaded with weight plates. Powerlifting evolved from a sport known as "odd lifts", which followed the same three-attempt format but used a wider variety of events, akin to strongman competition. Eventually, odd lifts became standardized to the current three.

In competition, lifts may be performed equipped or un-equipped (typically referred to as 'classic' or 'raw' lifting in the IPF specifically). Equipment in this context refers to a supportive bench shirt or squat/deadlift suit or briefs. In some federations, knee wraps are permitted in the equipped but not un-equipped division; in others, they may be used in both equipped and un-equipped lifting. Weight belts, knee sleeves, wrist wraps, and special footwear may also be used, but are not considered when distinguishing equipped from un-equipped lifting.

Competitions take place across the world. Powerlifting has been a Paralympic sport (bench press only) since 1984 and, under the IPF, is also a World Games sport. Local, national and international competitions have also been sanctioned by other federations operating independently of the IPF.

History

Early history

The roots of powerlifting are found in traditions of strength training stretching back as far as ancient Greek and ancient Persian times. The idea of powerlifting originated in ancient Greece, as men lifted stones to prove their strength and manhood. Weightlifting has been an official sport in the Olympic Games since 1896. The modern sport originated in the United Kingdom and the United States in the 1950s. Previously, the weightlifting governing bodies in both countries had recognized various "odd lifts" for competition and record purposes. During the 1950s, Olympic weightlifting declined in the United States, while strength sports gained many new followers. People did not like the Olympic lifts Clean and Press, Snatch and Clean and Jerk. In 1958, the National Weightlifting Committee of the Amateur Athletic Union (AAU) decided to begin recognizing records for odd lifts. A national championship was tentatively scheduled for 1959, but never happened. The first genuine national "meet" was held in September 1964 under the auspices of the York Barbell Company. Ironically, York Barbell owner Bob Hoffman had been a longtime adversary of the sport, but his company was now making powerlifting equipment to make up for the sales it had lost on Olympic equipment.

In 1964, some powerlifting categories were added to the Tokyo Paralympic Games for men with spinal cord injuries. More categories of lifting were added as time went by. In the 2000 Paralympic Games in Sydney, women were finally invited to participate in powerlifting. Finally, both men and women were allowed to compete in all 10 weight classes of powerlifting.

During the late 1950s, Hoffman's influence on Olympic lifting and his predominately Olympic-based magazine Strength and Health were beginning to come under increasing pressure from Joe Weider's organization. In order to combat the growing influence of Weider, Hoffman started another magazine, Muscular Development, which would be focused more on bodybuilding and the fast-growing interest in odd lift competitions. The magazine's first editor was John Grimek. During the late 1950s and early 1960s, various odd lift events gradually developed into the specific lifts of the bench press, squat, and deadlift, and they were lifted in that order. Hoffman became more and more influential in the development of this new lifting sport and organized the Weightlifting Tournament of America in 1964, effectively the first USA National championships. In 1965, the first named USA National Championships were held. During the same period, lifting in Britain also had factions. In the late 1950s, because members of the ruling body (BAWLA, the British Amateur Weight Lifters' Association) were only interested in the development of Olympic lifting, a breakaway organization called the Society of Amateur Weightlifters had been formed to cater for the interests of lifters who were not particularly interested in Olympic lifting.

Although at that time there were 42 recognized lifts, the "Strength Set" (biceps curl, bench press, and squat) soon became the standard competition lifts, and both organizations held Championships on these lifts (as well as on the Olympic lifts) until 1965. In 1966, the Society of Amateur Weightlifters rejoined BAWLA and, in order to fall into line with the American lifts, the biceps curl was dropped and replaced with the deadlift. The first British Championship was held in 1966. During the late 1960s and at the beginning of the 1970s, various friendly international contests were held. At the same time, in early November of each year and to commemorate Hoffman's birthday, a prestigious lifting contest was held. In 1971, it was decided to make this event the "World Weightlifting Championships". The event was held on the morning of 6 November 1971, in York, Pennsylvania. There was no such thing as teams and thus the event consisted of a large group of American lifters, four British lifters, and one lifter from the West Indies. All of the referees were American. Weights were in pounds. The lifting order was "rising bar", and the first lift was the bench press. There was no such thing as a bench shirt or squat suit, and various interpretations were held regarding the use and length of knee wraps and weightlifting belts. The IPF rules system did not exist yet, nor had world records been established.

Because of the lack of formalized rules, some disputes occurred.

There was no 52 kg class, 100 kg class, or 125 kg class.

At the first World Championships, one of the American super-heavyweights, Jim Williams, benched 660 lbs on his second attempt (no shirt), and almost locked out 680 lbs on a third attempt. Some other notable lifts were Larry Pacifico benching 515 lbs in the 90 kg class, John Kuc deadlifting 820 lbs, and Vince Anello attempting 800 lbs at 90 kg. Hugh Cassidy and Williams both totalled 2,160 lbs, but Cassidy got the win because of a lower bodyweight in the Super heavyweight division.

In 1972, the 'second' AAU World Championships were held, this time over two days – 10 and 11 November. This time there were 8 lifters from Great Britain (two of whom, Ron Collins and John Pegler, did stints as Referees), six Canadians, two Puerto Ricans, three Zambians, and one from the West Indies. With 67 lifters in all, the other 47 were Americans. Lifts were measured in pounds, the bench press was the first lift, and there were still no suits, power belts, or knee wraps. New Zealand's Precious McKenzie won his 'second' world title totalling 550 kg at 56 kg. Mike Shaw 'lost' his world title, which he had won the previous year, to American Jack Keammerer. Ron Collins made up for his 'bomb' on the bench in 1971 and stormed to the 75 kg title. Pacifico won against another American, Mel Hennessey, at 110 kg, both with enormous benches of 260 kg and 255 kg. At Super (over 110 kg) John Kuc beat Jim Williams with an incredible 2,350 lbs total (raw). Kuc squatting 905 lbs for a record squat and attempting a 397½ (875 lbs) deadlift again, and Williams benching a massive 307½ (675 lbs) – the greatest bench press ever at the time, before just missing with 317½ (700 lbs). Jon Cole, the Super heavyweight winner of the US Senior Championships 1972 and holder of the greatest total at that time with 1,075 kg (2,370 lbs), didn't show up to take on Kuc.

IPF and after
The International Powerlifting Federation was formed immediately after the contest and so none of the lifts could be yet registered as official world records. The 1973 Worlds was also held in York. This time there were only 47 entrants: one Swedish, one Puerto Rican (Peter Fiore, who was lifting for Zambia), two Canadians, one West Indian, eight British, and the rest Americans. The officiating became increasingly international and included Tony Fitton and Terry Jordan from Britain, a Canadian, and a Zambian. American Bob Crist was the IPF President and another American, Clarence Johnson, was vice president. 1973 was the first time that the lifts were done in the order now recognized – squat, bench press, deadlift (although still lifting in pounds). Precious Mackenzie won his third World title, easily beating American teenager Lamar Gant. 1974 was the first time that teams had to be selected in advance. With 74 entrants, this was the largest Worlds so far. The 52 kg class was introduced, and nine lifters entered. In 1975, the World Championships was held outside America for the first time, at the town hall in Birmingham, hosted by Vic Mercer. 82 lifters entered. Unusually for a competition, the super-heavyweights lifted first. This was because the television company filming the event was only interested in filming the "big guys". Hoffman sent over tons of equipment for this contest and did not take it back, and local legend says it is all still being used in Birmingham and the wider West Midlands region.

The establishment of the IPF in 1973 spurred the establishment of the EPF (European Powerlifting Federation) in 1974. Since it was closely associated with bodybuilding and women had been competing as bodybuilders for years, the new sport was opened to them very quickly. The first U. S. national championships for women were held in 1978 and the IPF added women's competition in 1979. In the US, the Amateur Sports Act of 1978 required that each Olympic or potential Olympic sport must have its own national governing body by November 1980. As a result, the AAU lost control of virtually every amateur sport. The USPF was founded in 1980 as the new national governing body for American powerlifting. Soon, controversy over drug testing would cause powerlifting to splinter into multiple federations. In 1981, the American Drug Free Powerlifting Association (ADFPA), led by Brother Bennett, became the first federation to break away from the USPF, citing the need to implement effective drug testing in the sport. Meanwhile, the IPF was moving towards adopting drug testing at international meets, and requiring member nations to implement drug testing at national meets as well. In 1982, drug testing was introduced to the IPF men's international championship, although the USPF championships that year did not have drug testing.

The IPF's push for drug testing was resisted by some American lifters, and in 1982 Larry Pacifico and Ernie Frantz founded the American Powerlifting Federation (APF), which advertised its categorical opposition to all drug testing.

In 1987, the American Powerlifting Association (APA) and World Powerlifting Alliance (WPA) were formed by Scott Taylor. The APA and WPA offer both drug tested and non-tested categories in most of their competitions. As of 2018 the WPA has 50+ affiliate nations.

Ultimately, the USPF failed to conform to IPF demands and was expelled from the international body in 1997, with the ADFPA, now named USA Powerlifting (USAPL), taking its place. Despite the trend towards more and more federations, each with their own rules and standards of performance, some powerlifters have attempted to bring greater unity to the sport. For example, 100% RAW promoted unequipped competition and merged with another federation, Anti-Drug Athletes United (ADAU), in 2013. The Revolution Powerlifting Syndicate (RPS), founded by Gene Rychlak in 2011, might also be considered a move towards greater unity, as the RPS breaks the tradition of charging lifters membership fees to a specific federation in addition to entry fees for each competition. Also, some meet promoters have sought to bring together top lifters from different federations, outside existing federations' hierarchy of local, regional, national and international meets; a prominent example of this is the Raw Unity Meet (RUM), held annually since 2007.

Developments in equipment and rules
As new equipment was developed, it came to distinguish powerlifting federations from one another. Weight belts and knee wraps (originally simple Ace bandages) predated powerlifting, but in 1983 John Inzer invented the first piece of equipment distinct to powerlifters—the bench shirt. Bench shirts and squat/deadlift suits (operating on the same principle) became ubiquitous in powerlifting, but only some federations adopted the latest and most supportive canvas, denim, and multiply polyester designs, while others such as the IPF maintained more restrictive rules on which supportive equipment could be used. The Monolift, a rack in which the bar catches swing out and eliminate the walkout portion of the squat, was invented by Ray Madden and first used in competition in 1992. This innovation was adopted by some federations and forbidden in others. Other inventions included specialized squat bars and deadlift bars, moving away from the IPF standard of using the same bar for all three lifts.

The rules of powerlifting have also evolved and differentiated. For example, in ADFPA/USAPL competition, the "press" command on the bench press was used, not used, and then used again, following a 2006 IPF motion to reinstate this rule. IPF rules also mandate a "start" command at the beginning of the bench press. Many other federations, for example, the Natural Athlete Strength Association (NASA), have never used the "start" command. As a further example of diversifying rules of performance, in 2011 the Southern Powerlifting Federation (SPF) eliminated the "squat" command at the beginning of the squat. Most federations also now allow the sumo variation of the deadlift, which varies with the feet being considerably wider apart and some tension taken off the lower spine being taken up by the legs. Many communities and federations do not class the sumo variation as a technical deadlift.
Another rule change into effect from the IPF, is the bench press depth rule, established in 2022 and coming into effect at the start of 2023. This rule, similar to squat depth, requires the bottom surface of the elbows to be in line with or below the top surface of the shoulder joint.

Supportive equipment
In powerlifting, supportive equipment refers to supportive shirts, briefs, suits, and sometimes knee wraps made of materials that store elastic potential energy and thereby assist the three lifts contested in the sport: squat, bench press and deadlift.
Some federations allow single-ply knee sleeves, which contestants can put on and off by themselves, and wraps for wrists in raw competition, while some don't and there are also some federations that hold raw records with and without wraps like GPA. Straps are also used, as help with deadlift in case of a weak grip but are not allowed by any federations in official competitions. A belt is the only supportive equipment that is allowed by all federations in raw competition. The use of supportive equipment distinguishes 'equipped' and 'un-equipped' or 'raw' divisions in the sport, and 'equipped' and 'unequipped' records in the competition lifts. The wide differences between equipped and unequipped records in the squat and bench suggest that supportive equipment confers a substantial advantage to lifters in these disciplines. This is less evident in the case of the deadlift, where the lack of an eccentric component to the lift minimizes how much elastic energy can be stored in a supportive suit. Supportive equipment should not be confused with the equipment on which the lifts are performed, such as a bench press bench, conventional or monolift stand for squat or the barbell and discs; nor with personal accessories such as a weightlifting belt that may allow greater weight to be lifted, but by mechanisms other than storing elastic energy. Chalk is commonly used by lifters to dry the hands, especially to reduce the risk of folding and pinching of skin while gripping the deadlift. Chalk can also be added to the shoulders for squatting and on the back for bench pressing to reduce sliding on the bench.

Principles of operation 
Supportive equipment is used to increase the weight lifted in powerlifting exercises. A snug garment is worn over a joint or joints (such as the shoulders or hips). This garment deforms during the downward portion of a bench press or squat, or the descent to the bar in the deadlift, storing elastic potential energy. On the upward portion of each lift, the elastic potential energy is transferred to the barbell as kinetic energy, aiding in the completion of the lift.
Some claim that supportive equipment prevents injuries by compressing and stabilizing the joints over which it worn. For example, the bench shirt is claimed to support and protect the shoulders. Critics point out that the greater weights used with supportive equipment and the equipment's tendency to change the pattern of the movement may compromise safety, as in the case of the bar moving towards the head during the upward portion of the shirted bench press.

Material and construction 
Different materials are used in the construction of supportive equipment. Squat suits may be made of varying types of polyester, or of canvas. The latter fabric is less elastic, and therefore considered to provide greater 'stopping power' at the bottom of the movement but less assistance with the ascent. Bench shirts may be made of polyester or denim, where the denim again provides a less-elastic alternative to the polyester. Knee wraps are made of varying combinations of cotton and elastic.
Supportive equipment can be constructed in different ways to suit lifters' preferences. A squat or deadlift suit may be constructed for a wide or a narrow stance; and a bench shirt may be constructed with 'straight' sleeves (perpendicular to the trunk of the lifter) or sleeves that are angled towards the abdomen. The back of the bench shirt may be closed or open, and the back panel may or may not be of the same material as the front of the shirt. Similarly, 'hybrid' squat suits can include panels made from canvas and polyester, in an effort to combine the strengths of each material. When two or more panels overlay one another in a piece of supportive equipment, that equipment is described as 'multi-ply', in contrast to 'single-ply' equipment made of one layer of material throughout.

Raw powerlifting
Unequipped or "raw" (often styled as RAW) or classic powerlifting has been codified in response to the proliferation and advancement of bench shirts and squat/deadlift suits. The AAU first began its raw division in 1994 and the term "raw" was coined by Al Siegal, who later formed the ADAU in 1996. The 100% RAW federation was founded in 1999; within a decade, many established federations came to recognize "raw" divisions, in addition to their traditional (open) divisions permitting single-ply or multi-ply equipment. RAW during this time frame, however, was looked upon as a beginner's stage by the elite lifters in powerlifting. In January 2008, the Raw Unity Meet (simply known as "RUM") was formed by Eric Talmant and Johnny Vasquez. It was a crucial contest that gathered the best lifters under one roof regardless of gear worn to compete without equipment. Brian Schwab, Amy Weisberger, Beau Moore, Tony Conyers, Arnold Coleman and Dave Ricks were among the first elite lifters to remove their equipment and compete raw. United Powerlifting Association (UPA) established a standard for raw powerlifting in 2008, and USAPL held the first Raw Nationals in the same year. Eventually, IPF recognized raw lifting with the sanction of a "Classic Unequipped World Cup" in 2012 and published its own set of standards for raw lifting. By this time, the popularity of raw lifting had surged to the point where raw lifters came to predominate over equipped lifters in local meets. Note that the IPF's use of the word 'classic' to describe raw powerlifting is contrary to most other powerlifting federations' use of the word to differentiate between 'classic raw' and 'modern raw': classic raw is still unequipped but allows the use of knee wraps, while modern raw allows knee sleeves at most.  The IPF does not allow knee wraps in its unequipped competitions and would thus be considered 'modern raw', but the IPF does not recognize the word 'raw.'

The use of knee sleeves in unequipped powerlifting has brought about much debate as to whether certain neoprene knee sleeves can actually assist a lifter during the squat. Some lifters purposely wear knee sleeves that are excessively tight and have been known to use plastic bags and have others to assist them get their knee sleeves on. This led to the IPF mandating that lifters put on their knee sleeves unassisted.

Equipped powerlifting 
Equipped lifters compete separately from raw lifters. Equipped lifters will wear a squat suit, knee wraps, a bench shirt, and a deadlift suit. These four things are what separate equipped lifters and raw lifters. A squat suit is made of an elastic-like material, and a single-ply polyester layer. This allows a competitor to spring out of the bottom of a squat (called "pop out of the hole" in Powerlifting circles) by maintaining rigidity, keeping him or her upright and encouraging their hips to remain parallel with the floor. This allows lifters to lift more weight than would normally be possible without the suit. There are also multi-ply suits giving the lifter even more rigidity, like that of a traditional canvas suit, with the same pop as a single-ply suit or briefs but are exponentially harder to use, and are usually reserved for the top lifters. During the squat, lifters also tend to wear knee wraps. Even though knee wraps will be a sub-classification of raw lifting it will still be worn by equipped lifters. A raw lifter who would squat in knee wraps will have the weight lifted noted as "in wraps" to distinguish this from the other raw lifters. Knee wraps are made out of the same, or very similar, elastic material as wrist wraps are made out of. They are wrapped around the lifters knees very tightly with the lifter usually not being able to do it himself and needing someone to assist them in doing so. The knee wraps are wrapped in a spiral or diagonal method. The knee wraps build elastic energy during the eccentric part of the squat and once the lifter has hit proper depth the lifter will start the concentric part of the movement releasing this elastic energy and using it to help them move the weight upwards. It gives the lifter more spring, or pop out of the hole of the squat resulting in a heavier and faster squat.

For the bench press, there are also single-ply and multi-ply bench shirts that work similarly to a squat suit. It acts as artificial pectoral muscles and shoulder muscles for the lifter. It resists the movement of the bench press by compressing and building elastic energy. When the bar is still and the official gives the command to press the compression and elastic energy of the suit aids in the speed of the lift, and support of the weight that the lifter would not be able to provide for himself without the bench shirt. In order to achieve proper tightness and fitting the lifter must be assisted when putting the bench shirt on for it is not possible to be done alone.

For the deadlift suit, there is single-ply and multi-ply as well. The elastic energy is built when the lifter goes down to set up and place their grip on the bar before lifting even starts. The deadlift suit aids in getting the weight off the floor, considered to be the first part of the movement, but not very helpful on the lockout portion of the deadlift, known as the second part of the movement.

Classes and categories 
Weight Classes:

Most powerlifting federations use the following weight classes:

Men: 52 kg, 56 kg, 60 kg, 67.5 kg, 75 kg, 82.5 kg, 90 kg, 100 kg, 110 kg, 125 kg, 140 kg, 140 kg+

Women: 44 kg, 48 kg, 52 kg, 56 kg, 60 kg, 67.5 kg, 75 kg, 82.5 kg, 90 kg, 90 kg+

However, in 2011, the IPF introduced the following new weight classes:

IPF Weight Classes:

Men: up to 53 kg (Sub-Junior/Junior), 59 kg, 66 kg, 74 kg, 83 kg, 93 kg, 105 kg, 120 kg, 120 kg+

Women: up to 43 kg (Sub-Junior/Junior), 47 kg, 52 kg, 57 kg, 63 kg, 69 kg, 76 kg, 84 kg, 84 kg+

Age categories

This depends on the federation generally but averages are as follows:

14-18 (Sub-Jr), 19-23 (Jr), Any age(Open), 40+(Masters)

The IPF uses the following age categories: sub-junior (18 and under), junior (19-23), open (24-39), masters 1 (40-49), masters 2 (50-59), masters 3 (60-69), masters 4 (70+). Age category is dependent on the year of the participant's birth. For example, if the participant turns 18 years old in January, he or she is still considered a Sub-junior until the end of that calendar year. Other federations typically break the Masters' categories down to 5-year increments, for example, 40–44, 45–49, 50–54, etc. Some federations also include a sub-master class from 33 (or 35) to 39.

Competition 
A powerlifting competition takes place as follows:

Each competitor is allowed three attempts on each of the squat, bench press, and deadlift, depending on their standing and the organization they are lifting in. The lifter's best valid attempt on each lift counts toward the competition total. For each weightclass, the lifter with the highest total wins. In many meets, the lifter with the highest total relative to their weight class also wins. If two or more lifters achieve the same total, the lighter lifter ranks above the heavier lifter.

Competitors are judged against other lifters of the same gender, weight class, and age. This helps to ensure that the accomplishments of lifters like Lamar Gant, who has deadlifted 5 times his bodyweight, are recognized alongside those of Danny Grigsby, the current All-time deadlift world record holder.

Comparisons of lifters and scores across different weight classes can also be made using handicapping systems. World federations use the following ones: IPF Points (IPF), Glossbrenner (WPC), Reshel (APF, GPC, GPA, WUAP, IRP), Outstanding Lifter (aka OL or NASA), Schwartz/Malone, Siff; for cadet and junior categories Foster coefficient is mostly used, while for master categories (above 40 years old) McCulloch or Reshel coefficients. Winner of a competition based on an official coefficient used by presiding world federation is called best lifter.

Events 

In a powerlifting competition, sometimes referred to as standard competition, there are three events: bench press, squat and deadlift. Placing is achieved via combined total. Some variations of this are found at some meets such as "push-pull only" meets where lifters only compete in the bench press and deadlift, with the bench press coming first and the deadlift after. Single lift meets (or full meets) are often held, sometimes alongside a normal 3-lift event. This is most common in the bench press.

At a meet, the events will follow in order: squat, then bench press, and the deadlift will be the final lift of the meet. If the federation also has an event for strict curls, this will normally occur before the squat event.

There are also, though very rarely, endurance meets (or "for repetitions" meets) where lifters compete in number of repetitions of exercise with the same weight (most often bench press and most often the weight is equal to lifter's weight). WDFPF held such competitions.

Rules

Squat 
There are two types depending on equipment used: conventional stand and monolift stand. In case of the former lift is called walked out squat and in case of the latter lift is called monolift squat. Most powerlifting federations allow for monolift squats. The ones that do not are the IPF, IPL and the WDFPF.

The lift starts with the lifter standing erect and the bar loaded with weights resting on the lifter's shoulders. At the referee's command the lift begins. The lifter creates a break in the hips, bends their knees and drops into a squatting position with the hip crease (the top surface of the leg at the hip crease) below the top of the knee. The lifter then returns to an erect position. At the referee's command the bar is returned to the rack and the lift is completed.

After removing the bar from the racks while facing the front of the platform, the lifter may move forward or backward to establish the lifting position. The top of the bar not more than 3 cm below the top of the anterior deltoids. The bar shall be held horizontally across the shoulders with the hands and/or fingers gripping the bar, and the feet flat upon the platform with the knees locked.
The lifter shall wait in this position for the head referee's signal. The signal will be given as soon as the lifter is set and demonstrates control with the bar properly positioned. The head referee's signal shall consist of a downward movement of the arm and audible command "Squat".
Upon receiving the head referee's signal, the lifter must bend the knees and lower the body until the top surface of the legs at the hip joint is lower than the top of knees.
The lifter must recover at will, without double bouncing, to an upright position with the knees locked. The bar may stop, but there must be no downward motion during recovery. As soon as the lifter demonstrates a controlled final position, the head referee will give the signal indicating completion of the lift and to replace the bar.
The signal to replace the bar will consist of a backward motion of the arm and the audible command "Rack". The lifter must then make a reasonable attempt to return the bar to the racks.
The lifter shall face the front of the platform, towards the head referee.
The lifter shall not hold the collars or discs at any time during the performance of the lift. However, the edge of the hands gripping the bar may be in contact with the inner surface of the collar.
Not more than five and not less than two loaders/spotters shall be on the platform at any time.
The lifter may enlist the help of spotters in removing the bar from the racks; however, once the bar has cleared the racks, the spotters shall not physically assist the lifter with regards to actually getting into the proper set position. The spotters may assist the lifter to maintain control should the lifter stumble or demonstrate any evident instability.
The lifter will be allowed only one commencement signal per attempt.
The lifter may be given an additional attempt at the same weight at the head referee's discretion if failure in an attempt was due to any error by one or more of the spotters.

Causes for disqualification 
Failure to observe the head referee's signals at the commencement or completion of a lift.
Double bouncing or more than one recovery attempt at the bottom of the lift.
Failure to assume an upright position with knees locked at the commencement and completion of the lift.
Movement of the feet laterally, backward or forward that would constitute a step or stumble.
Failure to bend the knees and lower the body until the surface of the legs at the hip joint is lower than the tops of the knees.
Any resetting of the feet after the squat signal.
Contact with the bar by the spotters between the referee's signals.
Contact of elbows or upper arms with the legs.
Failure to make a reasonable attempt to return the bar to the racks.
Any intentional dropping or dumping of the bar.

Bench press 
With his or her back resting on the bench, the lifter takes the loaded bar at arm's length. The lifter lowers the bar to the chest. When the bar becomes motionless on the chest, the referee gives a press command. Then the referee will call 'Rack' and the lift is completed as the weight is returned to the rack.

The front of the bench must be placed on the platform facing the head referee.
The lifter must lie backward with shoulders and buttocks in contact with the flat bench surface. The lifter's shoes or toes must be in solid contact with the platform or surface. The position of the head is optional.
To achieve firm footing, a lifter of any height may use discs or blocks to build up the surface of the platform. Whichever method is chosen, the shoes must be in a solid contact with the surface. If blocks are used, they shall not exceed 45 cm x 45 cm.
Not more than five and not less than two loaders/spotters shall be in attendance. The lifter may enlist the help of one or more of the designated spotters or enlist a personal spotter in removing the bar from the racks. Only designated spotters may remain on the platform during the lift. The lift off must be to arm's length and not down to the chest. A designated spotter, having provided a centre lift off, must immediately clear the area in front of the head referee and move to either side of the bar. If the personal spotter does not immediately leave the platform area and/or in any way distracts or impedes the head referees' responsibilities, the referees may determine that the lift is unacceptable, and be declared "no lift" by the referees and given three red lights.
The spacing of the hands shall not exceed 81 cm, measured between the forefingers. The bar shall have circumferential machine markings or tape indicating this maximum grip allowance. If the lifter should use an offset or unequal grip on the bar, whereby one hand is placed outside the marking or tape, it is the lifters responsibility to explain this to the head referee, and allow inspection of the intended grip prior to making an attempt. If this is not done until the lifter is on the platform for an official attempt, any necessary explanation and/or measurements will be done on the lifter's time for that attempt. The reverse or underhand grip is forbidden, as is a thumbless grip.
After receiving the bar at arm's length, the lifter shall lower the bar to the chest and await the head referees' signal.
The signal shall be an audible command "Press" and given as soon as the bar is motionless on the chest. As long as the bar is not so low that it touches the lifter's belt, it is acceptable.
The lifter will be allowed only one commencement signal per attempt.
After the signal to commence the lift has been given, the bar is pressed upward. The bar shall not be allowed to sink into the chest or move downwards prior to the lifter's attempt to press upward. The lifter will press the bar to straight arm's length and hold motionless until the audible command "rack" is given. Bar may move horizontally and may stop during the ascent, but may not move downward towards the chest.

Causes for disqualification 
Failure to observe the referee's signals at the commencement or completion of the lift.
Any change in the elected position that results in the buttocks breaking contact with the bench or lateral movement of the hands (between the referee's signals). Any excessive movement or change of contact of the feet during the lift proper.
Allowing the bar to sink into the chest after receiving the referee's signal.
Pronounced uneven extension of the arms during or at the completion of the lift.
Any downward motion of the bar during the course of being pressed out.
Contact with the bar by the spotters between the referee's signals.
Any contact of the lifter's shoes with the bench or its supports.
Deliberate contact between the bar and the bar rest uprights during the lift to assist the completion of the press.
It is the responsibility of the lifter to inform any personally enlisted spotters to leave the platform as soon as the bar is secured at arm's length. Such spotters shall not return to the platform upon completion or failure of the attempt. It is especially important for a spotter providing a centre lift off to leave the platform quickly so as not to impair the head referee's view. Failure of any personal spotters to leave the platform may cause disqualification of the lift.

Deadlift 
In the deadlift the athlete grasps the loaded bar which is resting on the platform floor. The lifter pulls the weights off the floor and assumes an erect position. The knees must be locked and the shoulders back, with the weight held in the lifter's grip. At the referee's command the bar will be returned to the floor under the control of the lifter.

The bar must be laid horizontally in front of the lifter's feet, gripped with an optional grip in both hands, and lifted until the lifter is standing erect. The bar may stop but there must be no downward motion of the bar.
The lifter shall face the front of the platform.
On completion of the lift, the knees shall be locked in a straight position and the lifter shall be standing erect.
The head referee's signal shall consist of a downward movement of the arm and the audible command "Down". The signal will not be given until the bar is held motionless and the lifter is in an apparent finished position.
Any raising of the bar or any deliberate attempt to do so will count as an attempt.

Causes for disqualification 
 Any downward motion of the bar before it reaches the final position.
 Failure to stand erect.
 Failure to lock the knees straight at the completion of the lift.
 Supporting the bar on the thighs during the performance of the lift. 'Supporting' is defined as a body position adopted by the lifter that could not be maintained without the counterbalance of the weight being lifted.
 Movement of the feet laterally, backward or forward that would constitute a step or stumble.
 Lowering the bar before receiving the head referee's signal.
 Allowing the bar to return to the platform without maintaining control with both hands.

Training

Weight training 
Powerlifters practice weight training to improve performance in the three competitive lifts—the squat, bench press and deadlift. Weight training routines used in powerlifting are extremely varied. For example, some methods call for the use of many variations on the contest lifts, while others call for a more limited selection of exercises and an emphasis on mastering the contest lifts through repetition. While many powerlifting routines invoke principles of sports science, such as specific adaptation to imposed demand (SAID principle), there is some controversy around the scientific foundations of particular training methods, as exemplified by the debate over the merits of "speed work" using velocity based training or training to attain maximum acceleration of submaximal weights. Powerlifting training differs from bodybuilding and weightlifting, with less focus on volume and hypertrophy than bodybuilding and less focus on power generation than weightlifting.
In bodybuilding, rep ranges of 6-12 per set have shown the best results when achieving hypertrophy. When performing these reps it is important to stay above 65% of one's 1RM.

Common set & rep schemes are based on a percentage of the lifter's 1RM (one rep maximum—meaning the most weight they are capable of lifting one time). For example, 5 sets of 5 reps (5x5) at 75% of the 1RM.  Rest periods between sets range from 2–5 minutes based on the lifter's ability to recover fully for the next set.

Recent advances in the accessibility of reliable and affordable technology has seen a rise in the popularity of velocity based training as a method to autoregulate daily training loads based on bar speed as a marker of readiness and neural fatigue status. Research has shown this to be effective when used both generally or on an individualised basis, and in some studies a superior programming methodology to percentage systems.

Accessory movements are used to complement the competition lifts. Common accessory movements in powerlifting include bent over row, good mornings, pull ups and dips.

Variable resistance training 
Variable resistance training relies upon adjusting resistance for stronger and weaker parts of a lift. Any given movement has a strength phase sequence which involves moving through phases where a person is relatively stronger or weaker. This is commonly called a ‘strength curve’ which refers to the graphical representation of these phases. These phases are based upon related anatomical factors such as joint angles, limb length, muscle engagement patterns, muscle strength ratios etc. Variable resistance training typically involves increasing resistance (usually weight) in the stronger phase and reducing it in the weaker phase. This means the percentage of 1RM for each of the phases respectively can be maintained i.e. lifting a barbell of 80 kg in the weaker phase of a squat is 80% 1RM for that phase, and lifting 120 kg in the stronger phase is 80% 1RM for that phase. The additional resistance can be added through the use of chains attached to the barbell e.g. for a squat in the lower weaker phase the chains rest more on the floor reducing the overall weight. And in the higher stronger phase the chains are lifted from the floor more increasing the overall weight. Bands can be used to increase resistance in a similar manner. Alternatively, partial reps with heavier weights can be used in conjunction with full reps with lighter weights. Training both phases accordingly through variable resistance techniques means the muscles can strengthen more closely in accordance with a person’s natural strength curve. It avoids a situation where, as a result of training, the weaker phase force potential is disproportionately great in regard to the stronger phase force potential. These benefits can help a lifter to become more explosive and to complete lifts faster.

Aerobic exercise 
In addition to weight training, powerlifters may pursue other forms of training to improve their performance. For example, aerobic exercise may be used to improve endurance during drawn-out competitions and support recovery from weight training sessions.

Nutrition 
Although powerlifting nutrition is very subjective as there can be a lot of differences from person to person, there are general guidelines that athletes typically follow in order to perform optimally that can be applied to a strength sport setting. The primary concern of most diets is caloric intake as sufficient calories are needed to offset the energy expenditure of training allowing for adequate recovery from exercise. The International Society of Sports Nutrition recommends 50-80 kcals/kg/day for strength athletes compared to the 25–35 kcals/kg/day recommended for the average human as regular training causes additional energy expenditure. Additionally, when powerlifters are in the off season, it is recommended that athletes increase their caloric intake in order to meet the recommendations of the ISSN and optimize their training. In addition to caloric intake, macronutrient intake plays a major role in the success of an athlete's diet.  Protein, carbohydrates, and fats all play different roles in the performance and recovery process. Optimizing protein intake enables a powerlifter to build more muscle and recover properly from intense training sessions. The Journal of Sports Sciences recommends that strength athletes consume 1.6g–1.7g protein/kg/day in servings of 20 grams, 5 to 6 times a day for maximal muscle growth. Sufficient carbohydrate intake allows an athlete to have adequate energy during training and restore any glycogen that is lost throughout their respect exercise. However, it may not be as crucial for powerlifters as it for endurance athletes like runners due to the nature of the sport. For strength athletes, it is recommended to ingest a range of 4g to 7g carbohydrate/kg/day depending on the stage of training. Timing carbohydrate intake around training sessions may benefit powerlifters by giving them more energy throughout their workout. Moreover, fats may help a strength athlete who is struggling to stay energized by providing more energy density, however, there is unclear evidence on the necessity of fats in a powerlifter's diet. In addition to nutrition from foods, it is very common for powerlifters to take supplements in their diets. Caffeine and creatine mono-hydrate are two of the most research and common supplements among strength athletes as are proven to have benefits for training and recovery.

Federations 
Prominent international federations include:
 World RAW Powerlifting Federation (WRPF)
 100% Raw Powerlifting Federation
 Global Powerlifting Committee (GPC)
 Global Powerlifting Federation (GPF)
 International Powerlifting Federation (IPF)
 International Powerlifting League (IPL)
 Xtreme Powerlifting Coalition (XPC)
 Natural Athlete Strength Association (NASA)
 World Drug-Free Powerlifting Federation (WDFPF)
 World Natural Powerlifting Federation (WNPF)
 World Powerlifting Alliance (WPA) (Founded 1987)
 World Powerlifting Congress (WPC)
 World Powerlifting Federation (WPF)
 World United Amateur Powerlifting (WUAP)
 United States Powerlifting Association (USPA)

Of these federations, the oldest and most prominent is the IPF, which comprises federations from over 100 countries located on six continents.

The IPF is the federation responsible for coordinating participation in the World Games, an international event affiliated with the International Olympic Committee. The IPF has many international affiliates. The next-oldest federation is the WPC, formed as the international companion to the APF after its split from the USPF.

Different federations have different rules and different interpretations of these rules, leading to a myriad of variations. Differences arise on the equipment eligible, clothing, drug testing and aspects of allowable technique.  The 100% Raw Federation allows no supportive gear to be worn by the lifter while the IPF, AAU, NASA, USAPL and the ADFPF only allow a single-ply tight polyester squat suit, deadlift suit and bench shirt, wraps for knees and wrists, and a belt in the equipped divisions. Other federations, such as the APF, APA, IPA, SPF, WPC, AWPC and WPO, allow opened or closed back bench shirts, multi-ply gear, and a wide array of gear materials such as canvas, denim, polyester etc.

Further, the IPF has suspended entire member nations' federations, including the Russian Federation, Ukraine, Kazakhstan, Iran, India and Uzbekistan, for repeated violations of the IPF's anti-doping policies. However Russia, Ukraine and Kazakhstan did not serve their full suspension as they took steps to meet the IPF requirements.

In January 2019, USA Powerlifting updated their policy to exclude transgender participation, in accordance with IOC guidelines.

Rank and classification 
There are several classifications in powerlifting determining rank. These typically include Elite, Master, Class I,II,III,IV. The Elite standard is considered to be within the top 1% of competing powerlifters. Several standards exist, including the United States Powerlifting Association classifications, the IPF/USAPL (single-ply) classifications, the APF (multi-ply) classifications, and the Anti-Drug Athletes United (ADAU, raw) classifications. Countries in the former Soviet Union use a somewhat different nomenclature for the top classes, distinguishing among Masters of sport, International Class; Masters of Sport; and Candidates for Master of Sport.

The Master classification should not be confused with the Master age division, which refers to athletes who are at least 40 years old.

Gyms 
Powerlifting gyms range from commercial fitness centers to private clubs. Some gyms gain fame due to their association with a training methodology (e.g., Westside Barbell), federation (e.g., Lexen Xtreme and the Xtreme Power Coalition [XPC]), or publication (e.g., SuperTraining Gym and Power magazine). Other gyms are notable for their association with champion powerlifters, for example Quads Gym and Ed Coan. Other notable powerlifters operate their own gyms, such as Scot Mendelson's F.I.T., Dan Green's Boss Barbell, Žydrūnas Savickas's Savickosportoklubas and Hafþór Júlíus Björnsson's Thor's Power Gym.

Global database 
The global meet results are available in a searchable web database.

World champions 
See: List of world championships medalists in powerlifting (men) or List of world championships medalists in powerlifting (women)

See also 

 World Drug-Free Powerlifting Federation
 Commonwealth Powerlifting Championships
 International Powerlifting Federation
 Paralympic powerlifting
 Olympic weightlifting
 Powerlifting USA
 Power training
 Strongman (strength athlete)
 U.S. intercollegiate powerlifting champions
 Weight training
 World Powerlifting Congress
 Progression of the bench press world record
 Squat (exercise)#World records
 Deadlift#World Records
 History of physical training and fitness
 List of powerlifters

Notes

References 

 
Individual sports
Athletic sports
Squatting position
Physical exercise